Puerto Rico Highway 128 (PR-128) is a road that travels from Yauco, Puerto Rico to Lares. This highway extends from PR-2 in Yauco and ends at PR-111 near downtown Lares.

Major intersections

Related route

Puerto Rico Highway 4128 (PR-4128) is a bypass road that branches off from PR-128 and ends at PR-111 west of downtown Lares.

See also

 List of highways numbered 128

References

External links

 PR-128, Lares, Puerto Rico

128